Bucharest Constantin Brâncuși Airport/Bucharest South Airport is a proposed new facility to support the existing Otopeni Airport. In June 2018 Romania's Government adopted a strategic investment package including a proposal for construction of Bucharest Constantin Brancusi Airport/Bucharest South Airport.

The airport is named after Romanian artist Constantin Brâncuși, a famous Romanian sculptor, painter and photographer who made his career in France. Airport ground access will be provided through the new Bucharest-Alexandria-Craiova highway and new Bragadiru-Unirii Square subway station projects. The investment package is to be prepared and awarded under a public-private partnership by the National Commission for Strategy and Forecasting.

History

In November 2019 Abu Dhabi Airports announced the signing of a MoU with South Development Group for the development of Bucharest Constantin Brâncuși Airport.

Terminals

The airport is projected with at least 5 terminals, which are planned to be constructed in 3 phases.

Future development

The airport plans a second  runway in addition to the existing  runway.

The airport targets to become an important cargo hub in Eastern Europe. The cargo terminal will be built in collaboration with Liège Airport.

References

Proposed airports
Airports in Romania
Transport in Bucharest